is a passenger railway station in located in the city of Kumano, Mie Prefecture, Japan, operated by Central Japan Railway Company (JR Tōkai).

Lines

Station layout
The station consists of a single side platform serving bi-directional traffic. There is no station building, and there is only a small shelter on the platform. The station is unattended.

Platforms

History 
Hadasu Station opened on 12 December 1961 as a station on the Japan National Railways (JNR) Kisei Main Line. The station was absorbed into the JR Central network upon the privatization of the JNR on 1 April 1987.

Passenger statistics
In fiscal 2019, the station was used by an average of 14 passengers daily (boarding passengers only).

Surrounding area
Hadasu Children's Center
 Hadasu Shrine

See also
List of railway stations in Japan

References

External links

 JR Central timetable 

Railway stations in Japan opened in 1961
Railway stations in Mie Prefecture
Kumano, Mie